2/9 may refer to:
February 9 (month-day date notation)
September 2 (day-month date notation)
2nd Battalion, 9th Marines, an infantry battalion of the United States Marine Corps